Dimorphopalpa striatana is a species of moth of the family Tortricidae. It is found in Venezuela and Costa Rica.

References

Moths described in 1999
Euliini